The following is a list of mecha anime. The list is organized by franchise.

See also 
BattleTech
Gundam
Megas XLR
Super Robot Wars
List of Sakura Wars media
List of Transformers animated series

Mecha